The Lindsley House (also known as the Horruytiner House) is a historic home in St. Augustine, Florida. It is located at 214 St. George Street. On September 10, 1971, it was added to the U.S. National Register of Historic Places.

References

External links
 St. Johns County listings at National Register of Historic Places
 St. Johns County listings at Florida's Office of Cultural and Historical Programs

Gallery

Houses on the National Register of Historic Places in Florida
National Register of Historic Places in St. Johns County, Florida
Buildings and structures in St. Augustine, Florida
Houses in St. Johns County, Florida